Yves Ducharme (born  1958) was the mayor of Hull, Quebec, in the Outaouais region, from 1992 to 2002 and from 2002 to 2005 mayor of Gatineau after the city had been merged with its neighbours, part of the supra-organization the Communauté Urbaine de l'Outaouais. He was defeated in an election in 2005 by Marc Bureau and decided to quit municipal politics. He became president of the Federation of Canadian Municipalities.

He first entered municipal politics in 1986 and was elected mayor of Hull in 1992. He was re-elected a number of times until 2002 Hull was forced to merge with the surrounding cities of Gatineau, Aylmer, Buckingham and Masson-Angers. The bigger city was named Gatineau and Ducharme became its first mayor in 2002 after beating Gatineau's former mayor Robert Labine in the election. In 2005 his reign came to end when he lost to first-time candidate, fellow councilor  Marc Bureau, who won 68% of the vote, in an election in which the participation rate was 47,3%.

References

See also 
 Gatineau City Council

1958 births
Living people
Mayors of Gatineau
Mayors of Hull, Quebec
Politicians from Montreal